Nanashi may refer to:

Nanashi, also known as 774, a Japanese manga artist, author of Don't Toy With Me, Miss Nagatoro
Nanashi, protagonist of the anime film Sword of the Stranger 
Nanashi (MÄR), a character in the manga series MÄR

See also
No Name (disambiguation)